Paul Bangay is an Australian landscape designer. Bangay's designs have been noted for their "precise angles, perfect symmetry, strong sight lines and rich detail."

Awards
In 2001, Bangay received the Centenary Medal for outstanding achievement for his role in designing and constructing the AIDS Memorial Garden at the Alfred Hospital. In 2018, he received the Medal of the Order of Australia for service to landscape architecture.

Published works
Bangay's published works include:

 The Defined Garden (1996)
 The Boxed Garden (1998)
 The Balanced Garden (2003)
 The Enchanted Garden (2005)
 Paul Bangay's Garden Design Handbook (2008)
 Paul Bangay's Guide to Plants (2011)
 The Garden at Stonefields (2013)
 Paul Bangay's Country Gardens (2016)
 Stonefields by the Seasons (2020)

Bangay's books are accompanied with photographs by photographer Simon Griffiths.

Bangay's designs are featured in books and magazines, including:
 House and Garden Aus. May 2011
 Rural Australian Gardens by Myles Baldwin
 Kitchen Gardens of Australia by Kate Herd
 Hamptons Gardens by Jack Delashmet

References

1963 births
People from Melbourne
Australian landscape architects
Recipients of the Medal of the Order of Australia
Living people